Corey Landon Maze (born January 4, 1978) is a United States district judge of the United States District Court for the Northern District of Alabama.

Education 

Maze earned his Bachelor of Arts, summa cum laude, from Auburn University and his Juris Doctor, cum laude, from the Georgetown University Law Center.

Legal career 

From 2008 to 2011, Maze served as the Solicitor General of Alabama. Before his appointment as Solicitor General, Maze prosecuted criminal trials and appeals for five years as an Assistant Attorney General. During that period, he argued three cases in the Supreme Court of the United States and won three "Best Brief Awards" from the National Association of Attorneys General.

From 2011 to 2019, Maze served as chief of the Attorney General's Special Litigation unit and acted as the state's primary counsel in complex civil matters such as the 2010 oil spill in the Gulf of Mexico and the ongoing opioid crisis.

Federal judicial service 

On May 10, 2018, President Donald Trump nominated Maze to serve as a United States district judge of the United States District Court for the Northern District of Alabama. On May 15, 2018, his nomination was sent to the Senate. He was nominated to the seat vacated by Judge Virginia Emerson Hopkins, who assumed senior status on June 22, 2018. On October 17, 2018, a hearing on his nomination was held before the Senate Judiciary Committee.

On January 3, 2019, his nomination was returned to the President under Rule XXXI, Paragraph 6 of the United States Senate. On January 23, 2019, President Trump announced his intent to renominate Maze for a federal judgeship. His nomination was sent to the Senate later that day. On February 7, 2019, his nomination was reported out of committee by a 13–9 vote. On June 11, 2019, the Senate voted 62–34 to invoke cloture on his nomination. On June 12, 2019, his nomination was confirmed by a 62–34 vote. He received his judicial commission on June 18, 2019.

Memberships 

He has been a member of the Federalist Society since 2017.

References

External links 
 
 
 Appearances at the U.S. Supreme Court from the Oyez Project

|-

1978 births
Living people
20th-century American lawyers
21st-century American lawyers
21st-century American judges
Alabama lawyers
Auburn University alumni
Federalist Society members
Georgetown University Law Center alumni
Judges of the United States District Court for the Northern District of Alabama
People from Gadsden, Alabama
Solicitors General of Alabama
United States district court judges appointed by Donald Trump